National Route 263 is a national highway of Japan connecting Sawara-ku, Fukuoka and Saga, Saga in Japan, with a total length of 48 km (29.83 mi).

The Mitsuse pass is mentioned in the Zombie Land Saga song "Saga Jihen".

References

National highways in Japan
Roads in Fukuoka Prefecture
Roads in Saga Prefecture